Ercheia kebea is a species of moth of the family Erebidae. It is found in Thailand, Sumatra, Borneo, Seram, New Guinea, Queensland, east to Fiji.

References

External links
Species info
CSIRO

Moths described in 1906
Ercheiini